Anderson County Schools is the operating school district for Anderson County, Kentucky. The district is governed by the Anderson County Board of Education, of which the current Superintendent is Sheila Mitchell. As of 2020, the district enrolled 3,555 students across 7 schools with 220 full-time teachers.

Schools

High school 

 Anderson County High School - Lawrenceburg, Kentucky

Middle school 

 Anderson County Middle School - Lawrenceburg, Kentucky

Elementary schools 

 Emma B. Ward Elementary School - Lawrenceburg, Kentucky
 Robert B. Turner Elementary School - Lawrenceburg, Kentucky
 Saffell Street Elementary School - Lawrenceburg, Kentucky

In addition to five traditional K-12 schools, the district also operates Anderson Community Education, the Anderson County Early Childhood Regional Training Center, the Ezra Sparrow Early Childhood Center and the Trailblazer Early College and Career Academy.

Anderson County Board of Education 
The Anderson County Board of Education is composed of five elected board members. As of December 2020, the current board consists of:

References 

School districts in Kentucky
Education in Anderson County, Kentucky